The Four Flusher is a lost 1919 American silent comedy film directed by Harry L. Franklin and starring Hale Hamilton and Ruth Stonehouse. It was produced and distributed by Metro Pictures.

Cast
Hale Hamilton as Lon Withers
Ruth Stonehouse as Suzanne Brooks
Harry Holden as Josiah Brooks
Ralph W. Bell as Penington Crane
Robert Badger as Jimmie
Louis Fitzroy as Ford
Fred Malatesta as Senor Emanuelo Romez (credited as Frederick Malatesta)
Effie Conley as Senora Flora Romez

References

External links

1919 films
American silent feature films
Lost American films
Metro Pictures films
American black-and-white films
1919 comedy films
Silent American comedy films
Films directed by Harry L. Franklin
Films based on short fiction
1919 lost films
Lost comedy films
1910s American films